Bakumpai may refer to:

 Bakumpai language
 Bakumpai people